Höhne or Hoehne is a German surname and may refer to:
 André Höhne (born 1978), German race walker
 Björn Höhne (born 1991), German volleyball player
 Christoph Höhne (born 1941), retired race walker
 Frederico Carlos Hoehne (1882–1959), Brazilian botanist
 Friedrich Höhne (1915–1962), highly decorated Oberstleutnant in the Wehrmacht during World War II
 Gustav Höhne (1893–1951), highly decorated General der Infanterie in the Wehrmacht during World War II
 Heinz Höhne (1926–2010), German journalist and historian
 Holger Höhne (born 1970), German curler
 Jutta Höhne (born 1951), German fencer
 Klaus Höhne (1927–2006), German actor
 Knut Höhne (born 1949), German fencer
 Mia Höhne (born 2000), German curler
 Otto Höhne (1895–1969), German World War I flying ace
 Friedrich Kaufmann Höhne (1831–1879), South African politician
 Verena Hoehne (1945–2012), Swiss journalist and author
 Höhne, a character in the television science fiction series Andromeda

See also 
 Hoehne, Colorado, an unincorporated town and a U.S. Post Office in Las Animas County, Colorado, United States
 Hohne (disambiguation)
 Hohn (disambiguation)